Itter is a municipality in the Kitzbühel District in the Austrian state of Tyrol.

Itter may also refer to:

People
Carole Itter (1935–1995), Canadian artist, writer and filmmaker
Diane Itter (1946–1989), American fiber artist
Gian-Luca Itter (born 1999), German footballer
Pascal Itter (born 1995), German footballer

Rivers in Germany
Itter (Diemel), a river of Hesse and North Rhine-Westphalia, tributary of the Diemel
Itter (Eder), a river of Hesse, tributary of the Edersee
Itter (Neckar), a river of Hesse and Baden-Württemberg, tributary of the Neckar
Itter (Rhine), a river of North Rhine-Westphalia, tributary of the Rhine

Other
Itter Castle, a 19th-century castle in Itter, Tyrol
Düsseldorf-Itter, an urban borough of Düsseldorf, Germany
Ittre (Dutch: Itter), a Walloon municipality, Belgium 
Itter Brass, a brass quintet from the Netherlands